The Gunston School is an independent, nonprofit, nonsectarian, coeducational, college preparatory high school located in Centreville, Maryland. It was founded in 1911 by Sam and Mary Middleton as The Gunston Farm School. Gunston draws students from seven Maryland counties: Queen Anne's, Kent, Talbot, Dorchester, Anne Arundel, Cecil, Caroline, and Delaware. There is also a large international student population that resides near the school with host families from the community.

History

The Gunston Farm School
1911 - 1950s. In response to the effects of their daughter's polio, Sam and Mary Middleton founded The Gunston Farm School in 1911 on their family farm on the Corsica River. The school's original curriculum focused on reading, writing, geography, and arithmetic. Athletics were almost exclusively focused on horseback riding considering the rural location. When Samuel Middleton died in 1929, Mary Middleton assumed the role of headmistress of the school. Middleton served the school for 35 years and oversaw the school's expansion into a girl's only boarding school.

The Gunston School for Girls
1950s - 1995. Gunston became an all-girls school in the 1950s. When Middleton retired in 1964, the headship of the school briefly passed to Mrs. Okie before she was succeeded by long-serving Headmaster Paul Long. Under Long's almost two decades of leadership, Gunston experienced significant growth in terms of enrollment, physical plant, and academic reputation according to the school itself. It is also said that headmaster Long is also responsible for starting many of Gunston's longstanding traditions such as Green & White Day and Yearbook Day.
In the later 90s, the school experienced a decline in admissions, reportedly due to the decline in demand for gender-based boarding schools. Gunston administration then made the decision in 1995 to rebrand as a coeducational day school.

The Gunston Day School
1995 - 2011. During Sturtevant's time at Gunston, the school began its Bay Studies program devoted to hands-on learning within the surrounding Chesapeake Bay area. The school was led by Jeffrey Wordworth in the early 2000s until his death in 2009. During his time as Headmaster Woodworth, he oversaw the addition of a crew team, the renovation of Middleton House, and the implementation of an international recruitment effort. His assistant headmaster, Christie Grabis, served as Interim Headmaster from 2009-2010. In July 2010, John Lewis IV was installed as The Gunston School's 8th Headmaster.

The Gunston School
2011 - present. As of August 16, 2011, Gunston Day School was formally reincorporated as The Gunston School.

Mission
The Gunston School’s mission is to nurture college preparatory students through personalized education and rigorous intellectual development. The school is interested in cultivating creative experiences and regards the connection with the community, especially with the Chesapeake Bay community as an important issue. The school is also committed with environmental topics and the importance of the involvement of young students.

Academics
The Gunston School's 35-acre waterfront is used for athletics and the school's own environmental education. Gunston's class sizes range from 10-12 students on average with a 9:1 student-to-teacher ratio. There are 29 full and part-time faculty members in their college preparatory program that includes the humanities, science, math, the arts, and athletics. The school year is divided into two semesters with semester exams held in December and June. Gunston requires 24 credits for graduation.

Athletics
The Gunston School hosts thirteen varsity team sports, five fitness programs, and two junior varsity sports teams. The school claims to have a wide range of athletic facilities: a six-court tennis facility, three full-size natural grass fields, a field house with a competition-sized basketball court, and the Corsica River with two docks for their sailing and rowing programs. As part of the school's holistic curriculum, all students must participate in a sport or fitness class for two of the three seasons each year.

Fall sports
Soccer
Field hockey
Sailing
Crew

Winter sports
Basketball

Spring sports
Crew
Sailing
Lacrosse
Tennis

33 international students were enrolled at The Gunston School for the opening of the 2017/2018 academic year.

References

Private high schools in Maryland
Educational institutions established in 1911
Schools in Queen Anne's County, Maryland
1911 establishments in Maryland